"A Rainy Night in Soho" is a song by The Pogues released in 1986, originally included on their Poguetry in Motion EP.

Two recordings and various mixes of the song were made in the studio.  Songwriter Shane MacGowan and producer Elvis Costello clashed over the final mix of the song, with MacGowan preferring a mix featuring a cornet, and Costello preferring a version with oboe.  The cornet version was used, except for Canadian editions of the EP, which used the oboe version.  A third version combining elements of both mixes was issued on the 1991 Poguetry In Motion re-issue, and is also available on the remastered and expanded Hell's Ditch CD.  Other mixes have surfaced on various compilations and bootlegs, and according to guitarist Philip Chevron there are "something like 13 versions... with different edits of the two recordings".

A video was filmed for the song. It shows Shane MacGowan with short beard, cool shades and leather jacket singing into a 1950s styled mic; the black-and-white footage is mixed with flicks from the protagonist's childhood and frames from nighttime London. Finally Shane dances the waltz with his girlfriend before a burning fire.

References

The Pogues songs
1991 songs
Songs written by Shane MacGowan